Exilia vagrans is a species of sea snail, a marine gastropod mollusk in the family Ptychatractidae.

Description
The length of the shell attains 53.5 mm.

Distribution
This marine species occurs in the South Pacific Ocean off Vanuatu.

References

 Kantor Yu.I., Bouchet P. & Oleinik A. 2001. A revision of the Recent species of Exilia, formerly Benthovoluta (Gastropoda: Turbinellidae). Ruthenica 11(2): 81-136.

External links
 Kantor Y.I., Puillandre N. & Bouchet P. (2020). The challenge of integrative taxonomy of rare, deep-water gastropods: the genus Exilia (Neogastropoda: Turbinelloidea: Ptychatractidae). Journal of Molluscan Studies. 86: 120-138

Ptychatractidae
Gastropods described in 2001